Prosek is a district and cadastral area in the north of Prague, Czech Republic. It is part of the Prague 9 administrative district and is bordered by Střížkov to the west, Letňany to the north, Vysočany to the south, Libeň to the southwest, and Prague–Kbely Airport to the east. Prosek has a population of 17,463 (2011). 

The area is home to a large panel housing estate, which was completed in 1971. In 2008, a Prague Metro station was opened in the district with a new office complex, Prosek Point, built next to it.

References

External links
 Local community website (in Czech)

Districts of Prague